The 1920 Connecticut gubernatorial election was held on November 2, 1920. Republican nominee Everett J. Lake defeated Democratic nominee Rollin U. Tyler with 63.04% of the vote.

General election

Candidates
Major party candidates
Everett J. Lake, Republican
Rollin U. Tyler, Democratic

Other candidates
Charles T. Peach, Socialist
Edward Pryor, Socialist Labor
Albert P. Krone, Farmer–Labor

Results

References

1920
Connecticut
Gubernatorial